Terry-Lynn Paynter (born 3 May 1969) is a former Bermudian javelin thrower and cricketer. She is the former captain of the national cricket team. She played for Bermuda at the 2008 Women's Cricket World Cup Qualifier.

References

External links 

1969 births
Living people
Bermudian women cricketers
Bermudian female javelin throwers
Athletes (track and field) at the 1991 Pan American Games
Pan American Games competitors for Bermuda